Sampson Mordan (1790 – 9 April 1843) was a British silversmith and a co-inventor of the first patented mechanical pencil. During his youth, he was an apprentice of the inventor and locksmith Joseph Bramah, who patented the first elastic ink reservoir for a fountain pen.

In 1822, Mordan and his co-inventor John Isaac Hawkins filed the first patent in Great Britain for a metal pencil with an internal mechanism for propelling the graphite "lead" shaft forward during use, as an improvement on the less complex leadholders that merely clutched the pencil lead to hold it into a single position.

Mordan bought out Hawkins and entered into a business partnership with Gabriel Riddle, an established stationer. From 1823 to 1837, they manufactured and sold silver mechanical pencils with the marking "SMGR". After the partnership with Riddle dissolved, Mordan continued to sell his silver pencils as "S. Mordan & Co.", adding many other types of silver and gold items to his product line. Mordan often made his pencils in whimsical "figural" shapes that resembled animals, Egyptian mummies, or other objects; like his other silverware and goldware, these pencils are now highly collectible.

Upon Mordan's death in 1843, his sons Sampson (junior) and Augustus inherited the firm. "S. Mordan & Co." continued to make silverware and brass postal scales until 1941, when their factory was destroyed by bombs during the London Blitz.

Sampson Mordan hallmarks 
The hallmarks changed over the years

References

External links
 Sampson Mordan-History-and-Examples-The-Whistle-Maker, Whistle Museum
 SampsonMordan.com

1790 births
1843 deaths
Burials at Highgate Cemetery
English inventors
English silversmiths